M. İrşadi Aksun (born 5 April 1957) is a Turkish professor of electrical and electronics engineering and the dean of College of Engineering at Koç University. He received his bachelor's and master's degrees from ODTÜ and his Ph.D. degree from the University of Illinois in 1990.

He returned to Turkey when he started to work in Bilkent University back in 1992. He passed to Koç University in 2001 as a professor of engineering and became the dean of College of Engineering in 2004. He received a TUBİTAK award for his project on multi layer electronic circuits.

References 

Turkish non-fiction writers
Turkish electrical engineers
1957 births
Living people
Middle East Technical University alumni
Academic staff of Koç University
Place of birth missing (living people)